This is a list of notable Nigerian people. It includes some but not all notable Nigerians.

Politicians

A–M 

 Abba Kyari – late Chief of Staff to President Muhammadu Buhari
 Abdulkadir Kure
 Abdulrahman Abdulrazaq
 Abdulsalami Abubakar
 Abiola Ajimobi
 Abubakar Olusola Saraki
 Abubakar Tafawa Balewa – prime minister of Nigeria
 Adebayo Alao Akala
 Adolphus Wabara
 Ahmadu Bello
 Ahmed Marafa
 Akanu Ibiam
 Akinwunmi Ambode
 Alex Ekwueme
 Alhaji Yahaya Madawaki
 Alvan Ikoku
 Aminu Waziri Tambuwal
 Anyim Pius Anyim
 Atiku Abubakar
 Augustine Ukattah
 Ayo Fayose
 Azuka Okwuosa
 Babajide Sanwo-olu
 Babatunde Raji Fashola
 Benjamin Kalu
 Bola Tinubu
 Bonaventure Enemali
 Bukola Saraki
 Chike Obi
 Chimaroke Nnamani
 Christopher Okojie
 Chuba Okadigbo
 Cornelius Adebayo
 Dangiwa Umar
 Dave Umahi
 David Mark
 Dennis Osadebay
 Desmond Elliot
 Dimeji Bankole
 Dora Akunyili  
 Ernest Shonekan
 Evan Enwerem
 Ezenwo Nyesom Wike
 Fela Kuti
 Festus Okotie-Eboh
 Florence Ita Giwa
 Franca Afegbua
 Gbenga Daniel
 Ghali Umar Na'Abba
 Godwin Obaseki
 Goodluck Jonathan
 Herbert Macaulay
 Ibrahim Babangida
 Ike Ekweremadu
 Imaan Sulaiman-Ibrahim
 Isa Mohammed Bagudu
 Issoufou Assoumane
 Iyorchia Ayu
 Jaja Wachuku
 Johnson Aguiyi-Ironsi
 Joseph Wayas
 Joy Emodi
 K.O. Mbadiwe
 Kayode Fayemi
 Ken Nnamani
 Margaret Ekpo
 Michael Okpara
 Mohammed Mustapha Namadi
 Moshood Abiola
 Muhammadu Buhari
 Murtala Mohammed
 Musa Babayo

N–Z 

 Naja'atu Bala Muhammad
 Namadi Sambo
 Ngozi Okonjo-Iweala
 Nnamdi Azikiwe first President of Nigeria
 Nwafor Orizu Nigeria's second head of state (1965–1966)
 Obafemi Awolowo
 Odumegwu Ojukwu
 Okechukwu Enelamah
 Oladipo Diya
 Olusegun Obasanjo
 Patricia Etteh
 Patrick Obahiagbon
 Peter Obi
 Peter Odili
 Philip Effiong
 Remi Babalola
 Reno Omokri
 Rochas Okorocha
 Rotimi Amaechi
 S. A. Ajayi
 Saleh Mamman
 Sam Obi
 Samuel Akintola
 Sani Abdullahi Shinkafi
 Shehu Shagari
 Sullivan Chime
 Tunde Idiagbon
 Umaru Musa Yar'Adua
 Yakubu Gowon

Human-rights activists 

 Aminu Kano
 Ayodele Awojobi
 Beko Ransome-Kuti
 Bisi Adeleye-Fayemi
 Dele Giwa
 Fela Kuti
 Funke Abimbola
 Funmilayo Ransome-Kuti
 Gani Fawehinmi
 Kayode Ajulo
 Kiki Mordi
 Olikoye Ransome-Kuti
 Olisa Agbakoba
 Omoyele Sowore
 Segun Awosanya
 Sonny Okosun
 Wole Soyinka
 Festus Keyamo
 Ken Saro-Wiwa

Military 

 Adekunle Fajuyi
 Akinloye Akinyemi
 Alexander Ogomudia
 Aliyu Mohammed Gusau
 Alwali Kazir
 Benjamin Adekunle (Black scorpion)
 Buba Marwa
 C. Odumegwu Ojukwu
 Chris Alli
 Chukwuma Kaduna Nzeogwu
 Dangiwa Umar  
 Halilu Akilu
 Hamza al-Mustapha
 Ibrahim Badamosi Babangida
 Idris Alkali
 Idris Garba
 Ike Nwachukwu
 John Nmadu Yisa-Doko first indigenous chief of air staff
 Johnson Aguiyi-Ironsi
 Mamman Vatsa
 Martin Luther Agwai
 M. I. Wushishi
 M. Ndatsu Umaru
 Mohammed Sani Sami
 Muhammadu Buhari
 Muhammed Shuwa
 Murtala Mohammed
 Oladipo Diya
 Olusegun Obasanjo
 Owoye Andrew Azazi
 Paul Omu
 Salihu Ibrahim                    
 Sani Abacha
 Sani Bello
 Theophilus Danjuma
 Tunde Idiagbon
 Victor Malu
 Yahaya Abubakar
 Yakubu Gowon

Musicians

Actors

Artists

Media 

 Ifeoma Aggrey-Fynn (died 2015) radio and television personality
 Sam Amuka-Pemu founder of the Vanguard newspaper, co-founder of The Punch
 Nicole Asinugo screenwriter and presenter 
 Nenny B media personality
 Lekan Fatodu publisher of Checkout Magazine.
 Babatunde Jose (1925–2008) journalist and newspaper editor; considered the "grandfather of Nigerian journalism"
 Farooq Kperogi author, columnist, journalism professor at Kennesaw State University
 Dele Momodu publisher, writer/journalist; entrepreneur, CEO of Ovation International magazine
 Benneth Nwankwo (born 1995), photographer, film director, talk show host
 Cornelia O'Dwyer Talk show host
 Femi Oke journalist and television presenter; former CNN International television anchor
 Bobby Ologun television personality in Japan and martial artist
 Adenike Oyetunde (1986- ) Nigerian lawyer turned radio host and amputee advocate
 Aisha Salaudeen (2017–present) – Nigerian journalist and feminist 
 Ikechi Uko publisher, Akwaaba African Travel Market, ATQnews.com; author; travel and tourism media consultant

Bloggers 

Kemi Adetiba
Uche Pedro

Educators 
Cletus Nzebunwa Aguwa professor of clinical pharmacy
Claude Ake  professor of Political Economy
Dennis Chima Ugwuegbu (born 1942) professor of psychology
Emily Alemika
Tessy Okoli
Thomas Adesanya Ige Grillo (1927–1998) professor of anatomy
 Jude Rabo vice-chancellor of Federal University, Wukari

Lawyers 
 Shaibu Atadoga
 Kayode Ajulo

Writers 

 Chimamanda Ngozi Adichie
 Chinua Achebe
 Jeffrey Obomeghie
 Mamman Vatsa
 Ogaga Ifowodo
 Lesley Nneka Arimah
 Adaeze Atuegwu

Business people 

 Alhaji Habu Adamu Jajere former president of Independent Petroleum Marketers Association of Nigeria (IPMAN) and winner of the Dr. Kwame Nkurumah African Leadership Award in Ghana.
 Aliko Dangote
 Ben Murray-Bruce politician and Chairman of Silverbird Group
 Femi Otedola – Nigerian businessman
 Habeeb Okunola CEO TILT Group of Companies
 Halima Dangote 
 Mary Nzimiro (1898–1993) businesswoman, politician and women's activist
 Obi Asika
 Taofik Adegbite CEO Marine Platforms

Religion 

 Blessed Cyprian Michael Iwene Tansi beatified by Pope John Paul II
 Wande Abimbola academician; Ifá priest
 Enoch Adeboye pastor; general overseer, Redeemed Christian Church of God
 Sheikh Abu-Abdullah Adelabu academician; Muslim scholar; writer; academic; publisher; cleric; founder and first president, AWQAF Africa and AWQAF Africa Muslim Open College (London)
 Anthony Olubunmi Okogie Roman Catholic Archbishop of Lagos
 Asi Archibong-Arikpo president of the Presbyterian Women's Guild in Nigeria, 1975–1982
 Benson Idahosa Charismatic Pentecostal preacher; founder, Church of God Mission International
 Bimbo Odukoya pastor; televangelist; founder, Fountain of Life Church
 Chris Okotie
 Chris Oyakhilome televangelist; founding president of Christ Embassy
 David Obadiah Lot pastor, Church of Christ
 Deborah Omale pastor, Divine Hand of God Prophetic Ministry
 Dominic Ekandem
 Emmanuel Omale founder, Divine Hand of God Prophetic Ministry
 Francis Arinze Catholic cardinal
 John Onaiyekan Catholic cardinal
 Joseph Ayo Babalola founder, Christ Apostolic Church
 Matthew Ashimolowo senior pastor, Kingsway International Christian Centre (London, England)
 Peter Akinola Anglican emeritus primate, Church of Nigeria
 Samuel Ajayi Crowther
 Sheikh Abubakre Sidiq Bello founder of Dairat Sidiq Faedot Tijanniyat of Nigeria
 Sheikh Dahiru Usman Islamic scholar, Dariqat Tijjaniya Movement
 T. B. Joshua Christian minister; televangelist and faith healer; founder, Synagogue, Church of All Nations; founder, Christian television station Emmanuel TV
 Taiwo Odukoya Senior Pastor, The Fountain of Life Church
 William Kumuyi pastor, televangelist; writer; founder and general superintendent, Deeper Life Bible Church
 Bishop David Oyedepo preacher; writer; founder and presiding bishop, Winners' Chapel (also known as Living Faith Church Worldwide); chancellor, Covenant University
 Sheikh Abubakar Gumi
 Sheikh Ibrahim Zakzaky

Sports people

International models 

 Agbani Darego winner, Miss World 2001
 Ibife Alufohai winner, Miss Valentine International 2010 and founder of Miss Polo International
 Mary Timms face of Next Generation Entertainment Awards 2017
Nelson Enwerem model, television personality and winner of Mr Nigeria 2018
 Oluchi Onweagba winner, M-Net Face of Africa competition 1998
 Omowunmi Akinnifesi

ICT and information professionals 

 Ekei Essien Oku – first Nigerian woman chief librarian
 Farida Kabir (born 1992) – software developer and entrepreneur
 Gbenga Sesan Nigeria's first Information Technology Youth Ambassador

 Philip Emeagwali 1989 Gordon Bell Prize winner

Medicine and science 
Adeoye Lambo psychiatrist
Ameyo Adadevoh credited with having restricted the spread of Ebola virus in Nigeria
Bennet Omalu forensic pathologist
Chike Obi mathematician
Eyitayo Lambo health economist and technocrat
Olufunmilayo Olopade oncologist
Olumbe Bassir biochemist and nutritionist
Segun Toyin Dawodu physiatrist, pain medicine and medical informatics physician
Philomena Obiageliuwa Uyanwah – obstetrician and gynecologist

Aviators 
 Adeola Ogunmola Showemimo
 Blessing Liman
 Chinyere Kalu
 Lola Odujinrin

See also 

 List of Nigerian Americans
 List of Nigerian Britons

References